Wola Korycka Dolna  is a village in the administrative district of Gmina Trojanów, within Garwolin County, Masovian Voivodeship, in east-central Poland.

References

Wola Korycka Dolna